Taz Express is a video game for the Nintendo 64, that was released only in Europe and Australia in 2000.

Gameplay 
The Tasmanian devil's wife made Taz get a job where he delivers mail.
In the game, the player controls Taz and must deliver crates to various destinations in the game with some puzzle solving along the way there. The crate must remain intact until it reaches its intended destination.

Reception 

The game received polarizing feedback from critics. Some reviews were favorable, such as Nintendo Acción's 88/100 score and Official Nintendo Magazine's 85% praise, while other reviews like N64 Magazine's 27% rating and Consoles +'s 5% criticism were far less positive.

References

External links
Taz Express - IGN

2000 video games
Infogrames games
Europe-exclusive video games
Nintendo 64 games
Nintendo 64-only games
Video games developed in the United Kingdom
Video games featuring the Tasmanian Devil (Looney Tunes)
Cartoon Network video games
Single-player video games